Padma Rao Sundarji aka Padma Rao is an Indian author and an international correspondent based in New Delhi, India.

Career 
Rao was the India correspondent for GEO magazine on India in 1992–1993 and also co-authored a travel guide on South India for Meridien Super Travel – Germany in 1994 .

Rao was the long standing South Asian bureau chief of German news magazine Der Spiegel, during which time, the Srilankan civil war was an intensive part of her beat. She wrote the book Srilanka: The New Country Harper Collins India covering the thirty year long civil war that ended in 2009

During her stint at Der Spiegel, she was chosen to interview heads of the government and rebel leaders of the times including the formerly underground Maoist leader Prachanda, Vellupillai Prabhakaran of the LTTE.

Rao writes in English and German and her work has appeared in syndicate in The New York Times, She worked as special correspondent at Wion Television India before moving on to Hindustan Times as national editor.

Award 
Rajiv Gandhi Excellence Award 2015 for Best Literary Personality of the year (Pehchan, New Delhi)

Other publications 
 Essay on Diego Garcia in Foreign Correspondent: 50 years – Penguin India, 2009.
 Essay on India-German relations in Rising India: Europe's Partner? - Weissensee Verlag, Germany

References

Further reading 
 

Living people
20th-century Indian women writers
People from New Delhi
21st-century Indian women writers
Date of birth missing (living people)
Year of birth missing (living people)